Vilma Palma e Vampiros is an Argentine pop rock new wave band from Rosario. They came to prominence in 1992 after the release of the hits "Bye, Bye" and "La Pachanga".

Origin of the name
Translated as Vilma Palma and Vampires, the name was taken from a graffiti  written over the metallic shutters of a closed furniture store by its former employees, calling out the manager: "Vilma Palma e Hijos Vampiros de los Obreros" (Vilma Palma and Sons, Vampires of the Workers). With time, the graffiti vanished until the words "Vilma Palma e Vampiros" remained by 1991.

This explanation makes for the grammatical error in the name: e is used instead of y (as and) only when followed by a word starting with i- or hi-.

Discography
 1992 - La Pachanga 
 1993 - 3980  
 1994 - Fondo Profundo  
 1995 - En vivo (Live album)
 1996 - Sepia, Blanco y Negro 
 1997 - Ángeles & Demonios 
 1998 - Hecatombe Disco 
 2000 - 7 (siete) 
 2002 - Vuelve A Comenzar 
 2005 - Histeria 
 2008 - Grandes Éxitos En Vivo Buenos Aires (Live album)
 2010 - 20 10 
 2012 - Agárrate Fuerte 
 2018 - Boomerang

References

External links
 Official site 

Argentine rock music groups
Musical groups established in 1990
Musicians from Rosario, Santa Fe